othing about me N

Gallery

References 

Populated places in Astara District